Gastrotheca splendens is a species of frog in the family Hemiphractidae. It is endemic to Bolivia. The only precisely known record is from the eastern slopes of the Andes in the Amboró National Park, in the Santa Cruz Department. Only two specimens are known. Common name Schmidt's marsupial frog has been coined for this species, in reference to Eduard Oscar Schmidt who described the species.

Description
The body is moderately robust. The is head is slightly wider than it is long but not as wide as the body. The snout is bluntly rounded. The tympanum is distinct; the supratympanic fold is weak. The fingers bear small and round discs as well as some basal webbing. The toes are less than half-webbed and bear discs that are slightly smaller than those on the fingers. Skin is dorsally smooth. Preserved specimens have dull grayish brown (tan) dorsal coloration with dark brown markings consisting of small, irregular spots (the female) or larger spots (the male). The venter is creamy white with dark brown flecks along lip margins and laterally on the chest and belly.

Habitat and conservation
The precise location of the holotype collected in 1857 is not known. Despite surveys in the area, there are no new records, so the species must be very rare. It is threatened by habitat loss caused by agriculture and infrastructure development. Chytridiomycosis is a potential additional threat. Management of the Amboró National Park to ensure survival of this species is crucial.

References

splendens
Amphibians of the Andes
Amphibians of Bolivia
Endemic fauna of Bolivia
Amphibians described in 1857
Taxa named by Eduard Oscar Schmidt
Taxonomy articles created by Polbot